Ramon Gittens (born July 20, 1987) is a Barbadian sprinter. He represented his country at the 2012 Summer Olympics as well as four outdoor World Championships in Athletics. He was the 100 meters silver medalist at the 2015 Pan American Games.

He competed for Barbados at the 2016 Summer Olympics in the 100 m and 200 m events. He finished 4th in his heat for the 100 m competition and did not qualify for the semifinals. In the 200 m, he finished 3rd in his heat and did not qualify for the semifinals. Gittens was the flag bearer for Barbados during the Parade of Nations.

Competition record

1Did not start in the semifinals

Personal bests
Outdoor
100 metres – 10.02 (+1.9 m/s, Montverde 2013)
200 metres – 20.42 (Bridgetown 2016)

Indoor
60 metres – 6.51 (Portland 2016)
200 metres – 21.20 (Albuquerque 2011)

References

External links

1987 births
Living people
Sportspeople from Bridgetown
Barbadian male sprinters
Olympic athletes of Barbados
Athletes (track and field) at the 2012 Summer Olympics
Athletes (track and field) at the 2016 Summer Olympics
Commonwealth Games competitors for Barbados
Athletes (track and field) at the 2014 Commonwealth Games
Athletes (track and field) at the 2018 Commonwealth Games
Pan American Games silver medalists for Barbados
Pan American Games medalists in athletics (track and field)
Athletes (track and field) at the 2007 Pan American Games
Athletes (track and field) at the 2011 Pan American Games
Athletes (track and field) at the 2015 Pan American Games
World Athletics Indoor Championships medalists
World Athletics Championships athletes for Barbados
St. Augustine's University (North Carolina) alumni
Medalists at the 2015 Pan American Games
Olympic male sprinters